Crinum bakeri is a species of flowering plant in the amaryllis family Amaryllidaceae, native to the Caroline Islands and the Marshall Islands. It was first described by Karl Moritz Schumann in 1887. It is probably a synonym for Crinum asiaticum var. asiaticum.

References

bakeri
Flora of the Caroline Islands
Flora of the Marshall Islands
Plants described in 1887